W900 may refer to:

Sony Ericsson W900i, a mobile phone
Kenworth W900, a long-haul transport truck